Buram Station is a station of the BGLRT Line of Busan Metro in Buram-dong, Gimhae, South Korea.

Station Layout

Vicinity

Exits

External links
  Cyber station information from Busan Transportation Corporation

Busan Metro stations
Busan–Gimhae Light Rail Transit
Metro stations in Gimhae
Railway stations opened in 2011